Vejvanov is a municipality and village in Rokycany District in the Plzeň Region of the Czech Republic. It has about 200 inhabitants. The historic centre is well preserved and is protected by law as a village monument zone.

References

Villages in Rokycany District